Tevin Stanvontae Mack (born May 1, 1997) is an American professional basketball player for Apollon Patras of the Greek Basket League. He played college basketball  for the Texas Longhorns, Alabama Crimson Tide, and Clemson Tigers.

Early life and high school career
Mack grew up in Columbia, South Carolina and began playing basketball at the age of three. He attended Dreher High School. He initially committed to VCU over offers from Clemson, South Carolina, UConn, and Georgia. When VCU coach Shaka Smart accepted the job at Texas, Mack followed him there.

College career
Mack averaged 5.1 points and 2.0 rebounds per game as a freshman at Texas, helping the team reach the NCAA Tournament. As a sophomore, he averaged 14.8 points and 4.8 rebounds per game before being suspended indefinitely for violating team rules in January 2017. Following the season, Mack transferred to Alabama. He averaged 9.0 points and 3.3 rebounds per game. Mack transferred to Clemson for his redshirt senior season, partially to be closer to his mother. On January 28, 2020, he scored a career-high 32 points in a 71-70 win against Syracuse. As a senior, Mack finished second on the team in scoring and rebounding with 12.2 points and 5.2 rebounds per game.

Professional career
On January 31, 2021, Mack signed with KB Prishtina in the Kosovo Basketball Superleague. He averaged 24.5 points, 4.0 rebounds and 2.4 assists per game. On July 29, he signed with Orlandina Basket of the Serie A2 Basket.

National team career
Mack was a part of the Clemson team chosen to represent the United States in the 2019 Summer Universiade in Italy. The U.S. received a gold medal after defeating Ukraine in the title game, and Mack averaged 9.5 points and four rebounds per game.

References

External links
Clemson Tigers bio
Alabama Crimson Tide bio

1997 births
Living people
American men's basketball players
American expatriate basketball people in Greece
American expatriate basketball people in Italy
American expatriate basketball people in Kosovo
American expatriate basketball people in Portugal
Apollon Patras B.C. players
Basketball players from South Carolina
Texas Longhorns men's basketball players
Alabama Crimson Tide men's basketball players
Clemson Tigers men's basketball players
Medalists at the 2019 Summer Universiade
People from Columbia, South Carolina
Shooting guards
Small forwards
Universiade gold medalists for the United States
Universiade medalists in basketball